Smick is a surname. Notable people with the surname include:

Danny Smick (1915–1975), American basketball and baseball player
David Smick, American economic writer
Elmer Smick (1921–1994), American theologian and professor

Americanized surnames
German-language surnames